Telekom Romania Communications (formerly known as Romtelecom) is a Romanian telecommunications company, which provides fixed voice, television and data services, for residential and business customers in Romania. As of 2020, Telekom Romania Communications is the 2nd largest fixed services provider in the country.

History

Mobile communications
The mobile communications company is now Telekom Romania Mobile Communications and is 100% owned by OTE Group.

Telekom Romania is the former Cosmote, the operator which shook the Romanian telecom market in 2006 when it launched a prepaid product at an unprecedented price, gaining millions of customers in months, and reaching a peak of 6.92 million subscribers by 2009. 

Cosmote was relaunched by OTE Group in late 2005 after several years of indecision following the 1998 launching of Cosmorom by Romtelecom. 

In July 2005, OTE's mobile division Cosmote decided to buy 70% of shares in Cosmorom from Romtelecom, and on 6 December 2005, it was rebranded as Cosmote România (known locally as Cosmote).

On 30 June 2009, Cosmote acquired Zapp Mobile, a CDMA mobile operator with 374,000 subscribers, which also had a 3G license. Following the Zapp acquisition, Cosmote launched its 3G service.

In September 2014, it was rebranded into Telekom Romania.
 
In June 2017, Telekom Romania conducted the first 5G live demonstration in Bucharest, Romania and SE Europe, with Ericsson, and later that year launched Telekom Banking, in partnership with Alior Bank.

Two first marked 2019: the introduction of the first prepaid service available in retailers’ chains, with full online activation, and the launching of Smart TV product.

On March 30, 2020 Telekom Romania was the first company in Romania to host an online press conference, featuring its chief executive officer Miroslav Majoros and unveiling the company's strategy facing the coronavirus pandemic.

In February 2021 Telekom Romania became the first telecommunications company to install charging stations for electric cars. Later in the year, it launched three services: Where's My Technician, 3D preview of phones, and the Live Shop.

Acquisition of fixed operations by Orange 
On July 28, 2021, The European Commission conditionally approved the acquisition of the Telekom Romania Communications by Orange, which was officially announced on November 9, 2020.

On November 9, 2020, Orange and OTE announced they reached an agreement to transfer the main stake of 54.01% shares in Telekom Romania Communications from the Greek group to the French company, which thus acquired Telekom Romania's fixed operations.
 
The Romanian state made no announcement regarding its stake of 45.99% in Telekom Romania Communications.  In July 2020, the European Commission conditioned the approval of the transaction on the sale by Orange of the 30% held by Telekom Romania Communications into Telekom Romania Mobile Communications, a condition fulfilled by OTE, announced on September 9, 2021, that it bought the stake from the French company.

Telekom Romania Mobile Communications continues to operate as a mobile telephony operator, providing mobile telephony and internet services. The company is fully controlled by OTE Group, in which the main stake is held by Deutsche Telekom.

Shareholders
Telekom Romania Mobile Communications S.A. (mobile services):
 OTE - 99.9999994%
 Individuals - 0.0000006%

Results

Mobile (pre-2014)

Radio frequency summary
The following is a list of known frequencies which Telekom employs in Romania:

References

External links

Deutsche Telekom
Telecommunications companies of Romania
Internet service providers of Romania
Cable television companies
Mobile phone companies of Romania
Companies based in Bucharest